Leptocarpus denmarkicus is a species of plant in the Restionaceae (rush) family, endemic to Western Australia.

It was first described in 1943 by Karl Suessenguth as Meeboldina denmarkica. However, in 2014, the genus Leptocarpus was expanded by Barbara Briggs to include Meeboldina and the species name became Leptocarpus denmarkicus.

References

External links
Leptocarpus denmarkicus: images & occurrence data from the Atlas of Living Australia

Restionaceae
Endemic flora of Western Australia
Taxa named by Karl Suessenguth
Plants described in 1943